The Church of Jesus Christ of Latter-day Saints in Guatemala refers to the Church of Jesus Christ of Latter-day Saints (LDS Church) and its members in Guatemala. The first convert in Guatemala was baptized in 1948. As of December 31, 2021, there were 284,780 members in 436 congregations in Guatemala. Guatemala ranks as having the 4th most members of the LDS Church in North America and 8th worldwide.

History

The first missionaries arrived in Guatemala in 1947. The first convert in Guatemala was baptized in 1948. The Central American Mission headquartered in Guatemala City was organized in 1952.  The church obtained official recognition in Guatemala in 1966. Guatemala's first stake was formed in 1967 in Guatemala City.

In October 2019, the Coban Guatemala Temple was announced by church president Russell M. Nelson. This was to be the third temple of the LDS Church in the country.

Missions
As of February 2023, Guatemala had the following missions:

Temples

See also

Religion in Guatemala

References

External links
 LDS Newsroom - Guatemala
 The Church of Jesus Christ of Latter-day Saints (Guatemala) - official site
 The Church of Jesus Christ of Latter-day Saints - visitors site

 
Christian denominations in Guatemala